Maaninka (also ) is a former municipality in the region of Northern Savonia, in Finland. It was merged with the city of Kuopio on 1 January 2015.

The municipality is mostly rugged forestland. The site, called Korkeakoski, has been a tourist site since the 19th century.

The municipality was unilingually Finnish.

People born in Maaninka
Taavetti Lapveteläinen (1860–1919)
Nestor Väänänen (1877–1930)
Tahvo Hiekkaranta (1879–1947)
Tatu Nissinen (1883–1966)
Salomo Savolainen (1883–1964) 
Pentti Pekkarinen (1917–1975)
Olavi Kuronen (1923–1989)
Tuula Väätäinen (1955–)
Jari Räsänen (1966–)

Gallery

References

External links
 
 Municipality of Maaninka – Official site 

Maaninka
Populated places established in 1872
1872 establishments in the Russian Empire
Former municipalities of Finland